Aksenov/Aksyonov (/; masculine) or Aksenova/Aksyonova (/; feminine) is the name of several rural localities in Russia.

Modern localities
Aksenov, Rostov Oblast, a khutor in Novotsimlyanskoye Rural Settlement of Tsimlyansky District in Rostov Oblast
Aksenov, Volgograd Oblast, a khutor in Verkhnekardailsky Selsoviet of Novonikolayevsky District in Volgograd Oblast

Alternative names
Aksenova, alternative name of Aksenovo, a village in Ivanovskoye Settlement of Sharyinsky District in Kostroma Oblast; 
Aksenova, alternative name of Aksenovo, a village in Belavinskoye Rural Settlement of Orekhovo-Zuyevsky District in Moscow Oblast; 
Aksenova, alternative name of Aksenovo, a village in Vyalkovskoye Rural Settlement of Ramensky District in Moscow Oblast; 
Aksenova, alternative name of Aksenovo, a village under the administrative jurisdiction of Fryanovo Work Settlement in Shchyolkovsky District of Moscow Oblast; 
Aksenova, alternative name of Aksenovo, a village in Chismenskoye Rural Settlement of Volokolamsky District in Moscow Oblast; 
Aksenova, alternative name of Aksenovo, a selo in Aksenovsky Selsoviet of Lyambirsky District in the Republic of Mordovia;

See also
Aksenovo
Aksenovka